Polymer Chemistry is a peer-reviewed scientific journal published by the Royal Society of Chemistry covering all aspects of the chemistry of synthetic and biological macromolecules and related emerging areas. It was established in February 2010 as a monthly journal and switched to biweekly in 2013. The editor-in-chief is Christopher Barner-Kowollik (Queensland University of Technology), while the executive editor is Neil Hammond. According to the Journal Citation Reports, the journal has a 2018 impact factor of 4.760.

See also 
 List of scientific journals in chemistry
 Soft Matter

References

External links 
 

Chemistry journals
Royal Society of Chemistry academic journals
English-language journals
Hybrid open access journals
Publications established in 2010